The Meadow Spring Historic District encompasses a predominantly residential area north and west of the traditional center of Fayetteville, Arkansas. This area was developed beginning in 1870 (after the railroad arrived in the town) and features mainly single-family residences on large level lots. It contains a variety of well preserved housing from the late 19th century into the mid-20th century, with both high-style and vernacular forms. Although there are a number of fine Queen Anne Victorians, the predominant styles are those of the early 20th century: Craftsman and a variety of Colonial, Tudor, and other revival styles.

The district was listed on the National Register of Historic Places in 2019.

See also

 National Register of Historic Places listings in Washington County, Arkansas

Notes

Historic districts on the National Register of Historic Places in Arkansas
National Register of Historic Places in Fayetteville, Arkansas
Neighborhoods in Arkansas